Aruvadai Naal is a 1986 Indian Tamil-language romantic drama film directed by G. M. Kumar in his debut. The film stars Prabhu and Pallavi. It was released on 1 November 1986. The film was remade in Telugu as Muvva Gopaludu (1987).

Plot 

Nirmala, an orphan Christian girl, lives in a convent and she wants to become a nun. She is then sent to a village by the convent for becoming a nun. She joins, the church's father Vincent Parker Soosai and she works as a nurse until she becomes a nun.

She then meets Muthuvel, an innocent young man, and they fall in love with each other. Rathnavel brings up his son Muthuvel without any affections and treats him like his worker, whereas his mother Vadivu loves him more than anything. When Rathnavel arranges Muthuvel's marriage with his niece, Muthuvel and Nirmala reveal him about their love. Rathnavel finally accepts for their marriage with Soosai's help. Nirmala is eager for her wedding and leaves the village for taking with her the convent's sisters.

In the meantime, Rathnavel prepares the puberty ceremony of Rajalakshmi, Muthuvel's niece, and manages to hide a Thaali inside a flower garland. Muthuvel, as an uncle and as per the customs, puts the flower garland around Rajalakshmi's neck and he married her without knowing. Soosai complains against Rathnavel for arranging a child marriage but the complaint is withdrawn. The rest of the story is what happens to Muthuvel and Nirmala.

Cast 

Prabhu as Muthuvel
Pallavi as Nirmala
Ramkumar Ganesan as Vincent Parker Soosai
R. P. Viswam as Rathnavel
Vadivukkarasi as Vadivu
Raasi as Rajalakshmi
Sathyajith
Kumarimuthu as Lotha
Usilaimani
Livingston
Raj Kapoor as a police officer

Production 
Aruvadai Naal is the directorial debut of G. M. Kumar, and the story was written by Livingston. Sivaji Ganesan's elder son Ramkumar made his acting debut with this film. According to Kumar, Aruvadai Naal was "chopped mercilessly" by the censor board.

Soundtrack 
The soundtrack was composed by Ilaiyaraaja, with lyrics by Gangai Amaran. Kumar said the song "Devanin Kovil" was almost removed from the film because Ilaiyaraaja felt the film did not need it, but it was retained after Kumar pushed.

Release and reception 
Aruvadai Naal was released on 1 November 1986, Diwali day. The Indian Express praised the film, saying, "Kumar and his team of technicians [..] have been courageous enough to make this film somewhat of an offbeat effort". Jayamanmadhan of Kalki wrote Aruvadai Naal is a film with unstriped margins that can tear the hand but with a different glow.

References

External links 
 

1980s Tamil-language films
1986 directorial debut films
1986 films
1986 romantic drama films
Censored films
Films directed by G. M. Kumar
Films scored by Ilaiyaraaja
Indian romantic drama films
Tamil films remade in other languages